Darkness Fell on Gotenhafen is a 1960 German drama film directed by Frank Wisbar. Heinz Schön presents the combined death toll as 9,343.

Sinking of MV Wilhelm Gustloff 
 was a German cruise liner laid down on 4 August 1936. Intended to be christened Adolf Hitler, she was eventually named after Wilhelm Gustloff, the assassinated leader of Nazi Party Foreign Organisation in Switzerland. She was launched into the Elbe on 5 May 1937.

The liner was constructed by Blohm & Voss, Hamburg as part of the Kraft durch Freude (Strength through Joy) program to endorse low-cost voyages for the German working class, with the belief that happy workers work harder. Up to 30 luxury liners had been planned, but only two were ever built.

At the outbreak of the war in September, 1939, the ship's original purpose came to an end. She was requisitioned by the Kriegsmarine and converted to a hospital ship until 20 November 1940 with the designation Lazarettschiff D (Hospital Ship D), but was often referred to as Lazarettschiff "Wilhelm Gustloff" (Hospital Ship "Wilhelm Gustloff").

After that, she became a floating barracks (accommodation ship) for around 1,000 men of the 2nd U-boat Training Division in the port of Gotenhafen (now Gdynia). Wilhelm Gustloff was moored there for more than four years until 1945 before she was put back into service as part of Operation Hannibal.

Commenced on 23 January 1945, Operation Hannibal was a German naval action under the initiative of Grand Admiral Karl Doenitz to evacuate German civilians and military personnel from the Baltic (Courland, East Prussia, and Polish Corridor) as the Soviet Red Army advanced. Doenitz asserted that the operation was to evacuate as many lives as possible away from the already-begun Soviet reprisals. Ships of all kinds took part in this massive rescue operation, which ceased in May 1945 as the war ended.

At 1230 hours on 30 January 1945, Wilhelm Gustloff left Gotenhafen for Kiel. By 1500 hours she had reached the open sea. According to the ship's official records, 6,000 to 7,000 people were registered. In fact, more than 10,500 people were on board, exceeding her designed capacity by about 8,650. The ship was 'Noah's Ark' for those escaping the advancing Soviet Red Army.

At 2108 hours, only about  after her departure, she was torpedoed by the Soviet submarine , commanded by Captain Aleksandr Marinesko. Before sinking Wilhelm Gustloff, Marinesko was facing a court martial for drunkenness. Four torpedoes were prepared and each had one nickname: 'For Motherland', 'For Leningrad', 'For the Soviet People', and 'For Stalin'. The first three were launched successfully and struck the port side of the ship.

After being struck, the ship listed rapidly to port. Within an hour, she sank  beneath the Baltic Sea. As many as 9,343 lives were lost. This remains the highest death toll of any ship sinking in history and is dubbed "the German Titanic." The number of casualties is six times greater than that of Titanic. 1,215 survivors were picked up by eight German ships that came to the rescue. S-13 launched two torpedoes at one of them without scoring any hits.

On 10 February 1945, S-13 sank another evacuation ship SS Steuben that was carrying about 5,000 people where only 650 survived.

In the end, only about 10 percent of the passengers survived, because many of the lifeboats were unusable, and the crew essential for lowering them were either trapped or dead following the first torpedo impact. Additionally, overcrowding that led to chaos trapped many passengers below decks, and the freezing waters of the Baltic Sea diminished the chance of survival for the floating survivors.

Cast 
 Sonja Ziemann as Maria Reiser
 Gunnar Möller as Kurt Reiser
 Erik Schumann as Hans Schott
 Brigitte Horney as Generalin von Reuss
 Mady Rahl as Edith Marquardt
 Erich Dunskus as Father Marquardt
 Willy Maertens as Father Reiser
 Edith Schultze-Westrum as Mutter Reiser
 Wolfgang Preiss as Dr. Beck
  as Servicewoman Meta
 Christine Mylius as Mrs Rauh
 Aranka Jaenke as Mrs Kahle
 Dietmar Schönherr as Gaston
 Günter Pfitzmann as Oberleutnant Dankel
 Erwin Linder as Kapitänleutnant
 Günter Ungeheuer as Doctor
 Karl-Heinz Kreienbaum as Radioman of the Gustloff
 Carl Lange as Captain Zahn
 Peter Voß as Captain Petersen
 Carla Hagen as Monica
 Til Kiwe as SS officer
 Georg Lehn as Mr Pinkoweit
 Hela Gruel as Mrs Pinkoweit
 Thomas Braut as Lieutenant von Fritzen
 Wolfgang Stumpf as Reese, First Officer of the Gustloff
 Ursula Herwig as Inge
 Marlene Riphahn as Mrs Kubelsky
 Martin Hirthe as Party guest
 Horst Frank as Narrator

References

External links 
 

1960s disaster films
1960s war drama films
German disaster films
German war drama films
West German films
Films directed by Frank Wisbar
Films set in 1945
Films set in the Baltic Sea
Films about seafaring accidents or incidents
World War II films based on actual events
Eastern Front of World War II films
World War II naval films
1960 films
1960s German films